AFS Racing is a professional racing team participating in the IndyCar Series and previously the Firestone Indy Lights series. It is owned by Gary Peterson, the founder of Automatic Fire Sprinklers for which it is named, and is based in Huntington Beach, California.

Indy Lights
The team was founded with the creation of the Infiniti Pro Series (now Indy Lights) in 2002. At that time the team's only driver was Peterson himself and he finished seventh in points with a best finish of fourth. In 2003 Peterson was joined by G. J. Mennen who made 7 starts and finished 13th in points. Peterson finished 10th. In 2004, Peterson only drove part-time but the team ran a second car for Arie Luyendyk Jr. for the final five races of the season after he left Sam Schmidt Motorsports. Luyendyk finished third in points. The team also fielded a car for sprint car racer Jay Drake in the Freedom 100 and he finished fourth. In 2005, the team ran only a partial schedule, fielding a car for Luyendyk in three races and Rocky Moran Jr. in the Freedom 100. In 2006 Alex Lloyd finished 7th in the team's primary entry while Luyendyk drove in four races and Thiago Medeiros, Phil Giebler, and Tyce Carlson all drove in one race each for the team. Lloyd captured the team's first two wins that season with victories in the Freedom 100 and the second Infineon Raceway race.

In 2007 the team formed a partnership with Andretti Green Racing and fielded cars full-time for Jaime Camara and Wade Cunningham. The partnership was often referred to as AGR-AFS Racing Cunningham finished third in points with a win at Watkins Glen International while Camara finished sixth in points. In 2008 the team fielded full-time entries for reigning Atlantic Championship champion Raphael Matos and Arie Luyendyk Jr. Matos won three races on his way to the series championship while Luyendyk finished fourth in points and captured his first series win in the season finale at Chicagoland Speedway. 2009 saw the team field entries for J. R. Hildebrand and Sebastián Saavedra. Hildebrand captured AGR-AFS's second consecutive championship on the back of four race wins while Saavedra won twice and finished third in points, winning Rookie of the Year honors. The team's 2010 drivers were Martin Plowman and Charlie Kimball. Plowman captured a win at the Mid-Ohio Sports Car Course and finished third in points while Kimball failed to win and got fourth.

IndyCar Series
The team first entered the IndyCar Series in 2009 by fielding a car in conjunction with Andretti Green Racing at Infineon Raceway for Franck Montagny. In 2010 the partnership participated in two road course races with driver Adam Carroll, finishing 16th and 19th.

In 2011 the team has separated from Andretti and is now on its own. It began the 2011 season only operating in the IndyCar Series with a single part-time entry driven by Raphael Matos. After failing to qualify for the 2011 Indianapolis 500, Matos and the team parted ways. They signed former AFS Indy Lights driver Martin Plowman to a three race deal in association with Sam Schmidt Motorsports, AFS's former Indy Lights rival. Hideki Mutoh was signed to drive the team's car at Twin Ring Motegi. Wade Cunningham, who earlier in the season debuted driving an in-house Schmidt Motorsports car, will drive in the season's final two oval races for the team. AFS Racing fielded a car in conjunction with Andretti Autosport at the 2012 Indianapolis 500 which was driven by Sebastián Saavedra. Unfortunately, Saavedra crashed and finished 26th. AFS Racing and Saavedra returned to race at Infineon Raceway for the GoPro Indy Grand Prix of Sonoma, where Saavedra finished 15th.

AFS spent the 2013 season away from IndyCar. It returned in 2014, this time partnered with KV Racing Technology, with a full-season entry for Saavedra.

Racing results

Complete IndyCar Series results
(key)

 In conjunction with Andretti Autosport.
 In conjunction with Sam Schmidt Motorsports.
 The final race at Las Vegas was canceled due to Dan Wheldon's death.
 In conjunction with KV Racing Technology.
 In conjunction with Chip Ganassi Racing.
 In conjunction with Juncos Racing.
 In conjunction with Schmidt Peterson Motorsports.

References

External links
AFS Racing Official Website
IndyCar Team Page

American auto racing teams
IndyCar Series teams
Indy Lights teams
WeatherTech SportsCar Championship teams